D23 may refer to:
 Almirante Valdés (D23), a 1959 Spanish Fletcher-class destroyer
 ARA Almirante Domecq Garcia (D23), a 1971 Argentine Navy Fletcher class destroyer
 HMS Bristol (D23), a 1969 British Royal Navy Type 82 destroyer
 HMS Premier (D23), a 1943 British Royal Navy escort aircraft carrier
 D23 (Disney), the official fan club of The Walt Disney Company
 Almirante Brión (D23), a Venezuelan Navy Almirante Clemente-class destroyer
 D23 road (Croatia), a state road
 LNER Class D23, a class of British steam locomotives